Abram Marshall Scott (March 13, 1785June 12, 1833) was a National Republican Mississippi politician born in Edgefield County in the Province of South Carolina. He was an early settler of Wilkinson County, Mississippi and was instrumental in founding the town of Woodville, Mississippi. He held local political offices before his election to the Mississippi State Senate.

He served in the state senate in 1822 and 1826–1827. In 1832, he was sworn in as the seventh Governor of Mississippi. He served until he died on June 12, 1833, due to a cholera epidemic in Jackson. He is buried in Greenwood Cemetery in Jackson, Mississippi.

Charles Lynch succeeded him in office. Scott County, Mississippi is named in his honor.

References

External links

 Abram Marshall Scott at National Governors Association
 

1785 births
1833 deaths
People from Edgefield County, South Carolina
Mississippi National Republicans
Deaths from cholera
Mississippi state senators
Governors of Mississippi
Infectious disease deaths in Mississippi
National Republican Party state governors of the United States